Kaisa is a Finnish and Estonian feminine given name, a diminutive of Katherine and its variants,  and may refer to:

Kaisa Korhonen (born 1941), Finnish writer
Kaisa Leka (born 1978), Finnish artist and politician
Kaisa Mäkäräinen (born 1983), Finnish biathlete
Kaisa Miettinen (born 1965), Finnish mathematician
Kaisa Nyberg, Finnish cryptographer
Kaisa Pajusalu (born 1989), Estonian rower
Kaisa Parviainen (1914–2002), Finnish javelin thrower
Anna-Kaisa Rantanen (born 1978), Finnish association football player
Kaisa Roose (born 1969), Estonian conductor
Sanna-Kaisa Saari (born 1987), Finnish beauty pageant
Aino-Kaisa Saarinen (born 1979), Finnish cross country skier
Kaisa Sere (1954–2012), Finnish computer scientist
Kaisa Varis (born 1975), Finnish cross country skier and biathlete

See also
Kajsa

Finnish feminine given names
Estonian feminine given names